Cigaritis schistacea, the plumbeous silverline, is a species of lycaenid or blue butterfly found in Sri Lanka, south India and Myanmar.

Description

Notes and references

 Biodiversity data portal

Cigaritis
Butterflies of Asia